An IUCN Red List critically endangered (CR or sometimes CE) species is one that has been categorized by the International Union for Conservation of Nature as facing an extremely high risk of extinction in the wild. As of 2021, of the 120,372 species currently tracked by the IUCN, there are 8,404 species that are considered to be critically endangered.

Molluscs

Arthropods

Chordates

Amphibians

Mammals

Reptiles

Turtles and tortoises

Lizards

Fish

Birds

References

IUCN Red List critically endangered species
Critically endangered fauna of the United States